Coffin from Hong Kong is a 1964 West German thriller film directed by Manfred R. Köhler and starring Heinz Drache, Elga Andersen and Ralf Wolter. It is based on the 1962 novel of the same title by James Hadley Chase.

The film's sets were designed by the art director Nino Borghi. Location shooting took place in Hong Kong and London.

Cast
 Heinz Drache as Nelson Ryan
 Elga Andersen as Stella
 Ralf Wolter as Bob Tooly
 Sabine Sesselmann as Janet West
 Angela Yu Chien as Lee Lai 
 Tommy Ray as Inspector Chang
 Monika John as Miss Dickens
 Greta Chi as Jo Ann Jefferson
 Angela Bo as Yu Pei
 Henri Guégan as Fighter
 Pierre Richard as Henry Gilbert
 Michael Bulmer as Mr. Belling
 René Scheibli as Anthony
 Willy Birgel as William Jefferson

References

Bibliography

External links 
 

1964 films
1960s thriller films
German thriller films
West German films
1960s German-language films
Films directed by Manfred R. Köhler
Films based on works by James Hadley Chase
Films based on British novels
Films set in London
Films set in Hong Kong
Films shot in London
Films shot in Hong Kong
Constantin Film films
1960s German films